Rencor apasionado (English: Burning Resentment) is a Mexican telenovela produced by Lucero Suárez for Televisa in 1998.

Natalia Esperón and Eduardo Santamarina starred as protagonists, while Aracely Arámbula, Magda Karina and Roberto Ballesteros starred as main antagonist.

History
On Monday, April 20, 1998, Canal de las Estrellas started broadcasting Rencor apasionado weekdays at 5:00pm, replacing María la del barrio. The last episode was broadcast on Friday, July 10, 1998 with La mentira replacing it on Monday, July 13, 1998.

From Monday, January 11, 1999 to Friday, April 2, 1999, Univisión broadcast Rencor apasionado weekday afternoons at 1pm/12c, replacing Samantha. The last episode was broadcast on Friday, April 2, 1999 at 1pm/12c, with El País de las mujeres replacing it on Monday, April 5, 1999.

From Tuesday, October 3 to Tuesday, December 26, 2000, Galavisión broadcast Rencor apasionado every Tuesday to Saturday mornings at 3am/2c, replacing María Isabel. The last episode was broadcast on Tuesday, December 26, 2000 at 3am/2c, with Nunca Te Olvidaré replacing it on Wednesday, December 27, 2000.

From Tuesday, March 2, 2004 to Saturday, May 22, 2004, Univision broadcast reruns of Rencor apasionado every Tuesday to Saturday mornings at 1am/12c, replacing Ángela. The last episode was broadcast on Saturday, May 22, 2004 at 1am/12c, with Mujeres engañadas replacing it on Tuesday, May 25, 2004.

From Wednesday, January 11, 2006 to Tuesday, April 4, 2006, TeleFutura broadcast Rencor apasionado weekday mornings at 8am/7c, replacing Sin pecado concebido. The last episode was broadcast on Tuesday, April 4, 2006 at 8am/7c, with 2 hours of Rosalinda replacing it on Wednesday, April 5, 2006.

Cast
 
Natalia Esperón as Karina Rangél/Leonora Lujan
Eduardo Santamarina as Mauricio Gallardo del Campo
Aracely Arámbula as Mayté Monteverde
Víctor Noriega as Gilberto Monteverde
Blanca Sánchez as Elena del Campo Vda. de Gallardo
Luis Gimeno as Cristino Reyes
Oscar Morelli as Ernesto Monteverde
Magda Karina as Mariana Rangel Sotomayor
Kuno Becker as Pablo Gallardo del Campo
Juan Carlos Serrán as Ricardo del Campo
Gastón Tuset as Lic. Marcelo Bernal
Patricia Martínez as Flor Jiménez
Silvia Caos as Esther Monteverde
Gustavo Negrete as Dr. Martínez
Gloria Izaguirre as Cholita
Alejandro Ávila as Alejandro Mena
Evelyn Murillo as Rebeca
Silvio Fornaro as Gastón Ginetti
Eugenio Lobo as Hilario
Rosita Quintana as Angelita
Rudy Casanova as Jerónimo
Juan Carlos Colombo as Dr. Otto Heifel
Juan Imperio as Vicente
Silvia Lomelí as Laura
Julio Mannino as Efraín
Mercedes Molto as Martha Valdivia
Julio Beckles as Juancho
Luis Gerardo Núñez as Gabino Sánchez
María Prado as Malvis del Río
Paola Otero as Katy
Rosita Pelayo as Adriana
Jorge Poza as Antonio "Tony" Mendiola
Raúl Ramírez as William "Bill" Harrison
Marco Uriel as Lic. Arcadio Mendiola
Julio Vega as Sebastián
Roberto Ballesteros as Carmelo Camacho
Ricardo de Pascual Jr. as Luis
Juan Ángel Esparza as Julio Rangel Rivera
Dolores Salomón "Bodokito" as Amparo
Fernando Torres Lapham as Doctor in Nipau
Lupe Vázquez as Angustias
Gabriela Salomón as Rosa
Oyuki Manjarrez as Nachita
Anna Sobero as Tiara
Eduardo Borja as Agustín
Pompín Iglesias as Rodobaldo Ilizariturri Menchaca
Luisa Huertas as Felicitas Ilizariturri Menchaca

International ranks

References

External links

1998 telenovelas
Mexican telenovelas
1998 Mexican television series debuts
1998 Mexican television series endings
Spanish-language telenovelas
Television shows set in Mexico City
Televisa telenovelas